Ropica gardneri is a species of beetle in the family Cerambycidae. It was described by Breuning in 1939.

It's 6 mm long and 1.5 mm wide, and its type locality is Kotturpuram, Chennai. It was named in honor of J. C. M. Gardner, an entomologist who worked in Dehradun.

References

gardneri
Beetles described in 1939
Taxa named by Stephan von Breuning (entomologist)